Cyrtoceras is an extinct genus of oncoceridan nautiloids that lived from the middle Ordovician to the middle Devonian, in Africa, Europe, North America and South America.

References

Sources
Fossils (Smithsonian Handbooks) by David Ward  
Fossils (A Golden Guide from St. Martin's Press) by Frank H. T. Rhodes, Paul R. Shaffer, Herbert S. Zim, and Raymond Perlman  
Aquagenesis: The Origin and Evolution of Life in the Sea by Richard Ellis

External links
Cyrtoceras in the Paleobiology Database

Prehistoric nautiloid genera
Devonian cephalopods
Ordovician cephalopods
Paleozoic cephalopods of Africa
Paleozoic cephalopods of Europe
Paleozoic cephalopods of North America
Paleozoic cephalopods of South America
Silurian cephalopods
Middle Ordovician genus first appearances
Middle Devonian genus extinctions
Fossils of Georgia (U.S. state)
Paleozoic life of Manitoba
Paleozoic life of Nunavut